Ari Santos (born 6 March 1982) is a Brazilian futsal player who plays for Dinamo Moskva as a Defender.

Honours
2 World Cup (2008,2012)
4 Liga Futsal (2002, 2003, 2007, 2008)
1 Intercontinental (2001)
1 Copa Paulista (2000)
2 Copas Gaucho (2001, 2003)
2 Grand Prix (2005, 2009)
1 Torneo Ibérico (2003)

References

External links
lnfs.es

1982 births
Living people
Brazilian men's futsal players
FC Barcelona Futsal players
Sportspeople from São Paulo